Nuts is a 2018 Chinese drama film directed by Li Xin and starring Zhang Ruoyun, Li Xian and Sandra Ma.

Plot
Huang Jian (Zhang Ruo Yun) is considered a genius in science and technology. Su Zi Cong (Li Xian) comes from a very wealthy family and has everything going for him, including looks and brains. They both compete for an opportunity to study with a famous applied physics professor at MIT.

To fulfill one of the requirements for the application, Jian joins a science organization. He meets Zhu Zhu (Sandra Ma), a rookie reporter who is there undercover to try to land a big scoop. Who will win the coveted position?

Cast
 Zhang Ruo Yun as Huang Jian
 Li Xian as Xu Zicong
 Sandra Ma as Zhu Zhu
 Liu Mintao
 Jiang Chao
 Li Xiaoyun

Reception
The opening gross is $1,333,111.
The perfect comedy elements and settings of "Nuts" make it the most different from other campus love stories.

References

External links
 
 

Chinese drama films
2010s Mandarin-language films